Taypi Qullu (Aymara taypi center, middle, qullu mountain, "center mountain", also spelled Taypi Kkollu) is a mountain in the Andes of Bolivia which reaches a height of approximately . It is located in the Oruro Department, Mejillones Province, Carangas Municipality, southeast of Carangas. Taypi Qullu lies northwest of Churi Qullu.

References 

Mountains of Oruro Department